Matthew McLean (born May 13, 1988) is an American competition swimmer who has been a member of several winning U.S. teams in freestyle relay events.  He was a member of the 2012 United States Olympic team, and earned a gold medal as a member of the winning U.S. team in the 4×200-meter freestyle relay at the 2012 Summer Olympics.

Early years

McLean was born in Cleveland, Ohio. He grew up in Sterling, Virginia, and attended Potomac Falls High School in Sterling, where he was a member of the Potomac Falls Panthers swim team. McLean won state championships in the 500-yard freestyle and twice in the 200-yard freestyle, and set a new state record in the 200.

College career

He received an athletic scholarship to attend the University of Virginia, and swam for the Virginia Cavaliers swimming and diving team in National Collegiate Athletic Association (NCAA) competition from 2008 to 2011. During his four years as a UVA swimmer, he won seventeen Atlantic Coast Conference (ACC) championships, and received fifteen All-American honors. He was recognized as the ACC Freshman of the Year in 2008, ACC Swimmer of the Year in 2009 and 2011, and ACC Swimmer of the Championships in 2008, 2009 and 2011. As a senior in 2011, he won the NCAA national championship in the 500-yard freestyle with a time of 4:10.15. He graduated from Virginia with a bachelor's degree in sociology in 2011.

Professional career

After graduating from the University of Virginia, McLean began training under coach Jon Urbanchek as a member of the Fullerton Aquatics Sports Team (FAST) in California. In August 2011, McLean won the USA Swimming National championship in the 400-meter freestyle with a time of 3:47.33. He was also part of the Duel in the Pool 2011 team, taking second place in the 200-meter freestyle and third place in the 400-meter freestyle events.

At the 2012 U.S. Olympic Trials, the qualifying meet for the Olympics, McLean made the Olympic team for the first time by finishing fifth in the 200-meter freestyle with a time of 1:46.78, which qualified him to swim in the 4×200-meter freestyle as a member of the U.S. relay team. At the 2012 Summer Olympics in London, he earned a gold medal by swimming for the winning U.S. team in the preliminaries of the 4×200-meter freestyle relay.

Following his Olympic run, he won gold in the 4×200 freestyle relay at both the 2013 World Aquatics Championships and the short course version in 2014. Additionally, he won gold in the long course 4×200 freestyle relay in the 2014 Pan Pacific Swimming Championships. As of 2014, he is a member of the North Baltimore Aquatic Center.

See also

 List of Olympic medalists in swimming (men)
 List of University of Virginia people

References

External links
 
  (archive)
 
 
 

1988 births
Living people
American male freestyle swimmers
Medalists at the FINA World Swimming Championships (25 m)
Medalists at the 2012 Summer Olympics
Olympic gold medalists for the United States in swimming
People from Sterling, Virginia
Sportspeople from Cleveland
Swimmers at the 2012 Summer Olympics
Virginia Cavaliers men's swimmers
World Aquatics Championships medalists in swimming
Universiade medalists in swimming
Universiade gold medalists for the United States
Medalists at the 2011 Summer Universiade